Jarod James Palmer (born February 10, 1986) is an American former professional ice hockey forward who played with the Minnesota Wild of the National Hockey League. He is a native of Fridley, Minnesota, and an alum of the USNTDP, where he played for two seasons. Palmer was a member of the silver medal-winning U.S. squad at the World Under-18 Championship in 2004. After graduating from high school, he spent two seasons in the USHL with the Tri-City Storm. Palmer then completed four years of collegiate hockey at Miami University in Oxford, Ohio. He made his NHL debut with the Wild on December 17, 2011.

Playing career

Prep/Junior
Palmer played for two seasons at Fridley High School, beginning as an eighth grader. He spent his sophomore campaign at Spring Lake Park High School, where he teamed with future St. Louis Blues captain, David Backes. Subsequently, Palmer was selected to the U.S. National Team Development Program, and played for two seasons, appearing in 108 games. His greatest individual honor as a prep came in the 2004 World Championship semi-final game versus Czech Republic, where Palmer won player of the game honors. Later, his team went on to win the silver medal at the World Under-18 Championship in Belarus.

After two years with the USNTDP, Palmer joined the Tri-City Storm from 2004–2006 and appeared in 110 games.  In his first year with the Storm, Palmer recorded 41 points on 15 goals and 26 assists. In his second year, he finished with 53 points, scoring 15 goals and 37 assists. He holds the team record for fastest goal to start a game, scoring 9 seconds in.  He was named captain of the Storm for the 2005-06 season.

College
Palmer was recruited to play for Miami University. He suited up for the Redhawks from 2006–2010 and appeared in all 169 games during his career, setting the school record. He competed in the 2009 NCAA National Championship game as a junior. In his freshman season in 2006-07, he played in all 42 games posting 30 points with 11 goals and 19 assists.  He was named CCHA Rookie of the Week on Dec. 12 and was awarded Miami's Rookie of the Year Award.

In 2007-08, he played in all 42 games producing 35 points with 10 goals and 25 assists. He was again honored with a CCHA award, this time as the Offensive Player of the Week.

His junior season in 2008-09, concluded with the NCAA National Championship game. The Redhawks were defeated in overtime 4-3, by Boston University. Palmer appeared in all 41 games and tallied 8 goals and 19 assists for 27 points.
	
Following the stunning defeat in the 2009 NCAA title game, Palmer returned for his senior year in 2009-10. He again played in all 44 games and lead the team in scoring with 45 points. He was named to the 2010 CCHA First-Team and was a two-time recipient of the league's Offensive Player of the Week honors.

Professional
On April 24, 2010, Palmer signed an entry-level contract as a free agent with the Minnesota Wild. He made his NHL debut for his hometown Wild on December 17, 2011, versus the New York Islanders. He recorded 6 shots on goal and finished with an even plus/minus rating. His first NHL goal occurred on Thursday December 29, 2011 against Nikolai Khabibulin of the Edmonton Oilers; time of the goal was 10:02 of the second period. Later in the same game, Palmer suffered a concussion which effectively ended his season with the Wild.

Palmer re-signed with the Wild as a restricted free agent to a one-year contract for the 2012–13 season. He was reassigned to Houston and was limited to only 17 games, producing 8 points, throughout the season due to lingering injury.

Following the season, Palmer opted to retire from professional hockey and on July 25, 2013, was announced as the inaugural head coach of the Sugar Land Imperials of the major junior NA3HL.

Personal life
Born in Fridley, Minnesota. As an eighth grader, played varsity hockey for Fridley High School alongside his older sister and older brother. Graduated with honors from Pioneer High School in Ann Arbor, Michigan while playing for the USNTDP. In 2010, Palmer completed an interdisciplinary business degree in Entrepreneurship, graduating with honors from the Farmer School of Business at Miami University. Palmer married in the summer of 2011, and resides in Minnesota. He is the youngest son of coach Jeff and Charlene Palmer.

Career statistics

Regular season and playoffs

International

Awards and achievements

References

External links

 Wildlighthouse: Miami Coach Blasi on Palmer
 Hockeysfuture Prospect Information
 Hockeywilderness.com: Minnesota Wild Blog
  USHL.com: Tri City info
 2009 YouTube video: Rookie Camp Shootout Goal
 2010 YouTube video: Rookie Camp Shootout

1986 births
American men's ice hockey forwards
Houston Aeros (1994–2013) players
Ice hockey players from Minnesota
Living people
Miami RedHawks men's ice hockey players
Minnesota Wild players
People from Fridley, Minnesota
Tri-City Storm players
Undrafted National Hockey League players